Young Lake or Youngs Lake is a lake located in The town of Warren in Herkimer County, New York. Weaver Lake is north of and drains into Young Lake. Young Lake is south of Weaver Lake, the two are collectively known as either "Waiontha Lakes" or "the Little Lakes". Waiontha Mountain, located west was named after the Waiontha Lakes.

Fishing
Most of the fishing done on the lake is done in the winter months in the form of ice fishing. Fish species present in the lake are blue gill, yellow perch and black crappie.

References

Lakes of New York (state)
Lakes of Herkimer County, New York